Buduburam is a refugee camp located  west of Accra, Ghana. It is along the Accra-Cape Coast Highway. Opened by the United Nations High Commissioner for Refugees (UNHCR) in 1990, the camp is home to more than 12,000 refugees from Liberia who fled their country during the First Liberian Civil War (1989–1996) and the Second Liberian Civil War (1999–2003), in addition to refugees from Sierra Leone who escaped from their civil war (1991–2002). The camp is served by Liberian and international NGO groups and volunteer organizations. The Carolyn A. Miller Elementary School provides free education to nearly 500 children in the camp.

The UNHCR began pulling out of the camp in April 2007, slowly withdrawing all UNHCR-administered services. June 2010 was the official cessation of refugee status for the refugees in the settlement. Buduburam, located in Ghana, was established in 1990 to accommodate the influx of Liberian refugees who fled to Ghana when Charles Taylor came to power. Initially, the UNHCR provided the settlement's residents with individual aid and relief.

In 1997, Liberia held elections that the UN judged to be fair enough to allow for safe repatriation conditions. As a result, the UNHCR discontinued refugee assistance to Liberians in Ghana, and the settlement lost much of its funding. During this time, an estimated 3,000 refugees returned to Liberia. Most chose to remain in Ghana, and the Buduburam settlement served as the center of their community.

Soon after the 1997 elections, the political situation in Liberia worsened, and fresh arrivals of Liberian refugees to Ghana led the UNHCR to return to Buduburam. Although the UNHCR limits its personal aid efforts in the settlement to unaccompanied minors, the elderly, and the disabled, the organization does sponsor infrastructure work within the community, funding projects such as construction and education.

Now host to over 42,000 refugees, most of whom are Liberian, the settlement still receives new refugees on a regular basis.

In February 2011, the Deputy Minister of Information in Ghana indicated that Buduburam is no longer needed and that the inhabitants should consider returning to Liberia or settling elsewhere in Ghana.

Canadian soccer player Alphonso Davies was born in Buduburam in 2000 before moving to Edmonton, Canada at the age of five.

In 2008, the University of Alberta, in a collaborative initiative involving faculty, staff, and students, as well as camp musicians and a camp NGO (Center for Youth Empowerment) produced a music CD entitled Giving Voice to Hope: Music of Liberian Refugees, featuring 16 Liberian musical groups then residing as refugees in Buduburam. The music CD, including extensive liner notes, is a creative initiative to explore the social impact and realities of civil war and refugees, raising global awareness about Buduburam, conflict, and displacement in West Africa, while raising profiles of participating musicians, supporting them with royalties from CD sales, and generally encouraging music-making in the camp. Musical recordings represent life in Buduburam through multiple genres: traditional, gospel, hip hop, rap, R&B, and reggae.

References

Populated places in the Central Region (Ghana)
Demographics of Liberia
B
1990 establishments in Ghana